Olympic Airways Flight 954 was a Douglas DC-6B aircraft that crashed into a mountain near Keratea (approx. coordinates 37°48' N, 23°57' E), Greece, on December 8th, 1969. All 85 passengers and 5 crew on board died in the crash.

The crash
The flight was a domestic scheduled passenger service from Chania on the island of Crete to Athens. While on approach to Athens and with its undercarriage retracted, the aircraft struck Mount Paneio at an altitude of approximately 2,000 feet. The weather at the time of the crash was characterized by rain and high winds.

The crash of Flight 954 was the deadliest aviation accident in Greek history at the time it took place, a record it maintained until the crash of Helios Airways Flight 522 nearly thirty-six years later. It is still the deadliest aviation accident involving a Douglas DC-6., and deadliest crash in the history of Olympic Airways.

Cause
It was ruled that the flight crew had deviated from the proper track and descended below the minimum safe altitude while making an ILS approach.

References

External links

1969 in Greece
Aviation accidents and incidents in 1969
Airliner accidents and incidents involving controlled flight into terrain
Airliner accidents and incidents caused by pilot error
Airliner accidents and incidents caused by weather
Aviation accidents and incidents in Greece
Accidents and incidents involving the Douglas DC-6
Olympic Airlines accidents and incidents
December 1969 events in Europe